The Diary of the Madmen is the fourth studio album by alternative rock band Len, released in 2005. A promotional version of the album was released in 2002 under the title We Be Who We Be.

Track listing

Samples
"People (Come Together)"
"Reach Out of the Darkness" by Friend & Lover
"Electric Relaxation" by A Tribe Called Quest

"We Be Who We Be"
"The International Zone Coaster" by Leaders of the New School
"Doowutchyalike" by Digital Underground

"Get Down"
"Spirit of the Boogie" by Kool & the Gang

We Be Who We Be

We Be Who We Be is the fourth studio album by the Canadian alternative rock band Len, released by Linus Entertainment in 2002. The album was reissued with additional and altered tracks by Venus Corp. in 2005 as The Diary of the Madmen.

Samples
"Saturday"
"Gimme the Finga" by Black Sheep

References

2005 albums
Len (band) albums